The Moonwater pictures is a movie production house based out of Hyderabad, Telangana. The production house was founded in 2008 by Mahi V Raghav, Rakesh Mahankali and Pavan Kumar Reddy. It has produced and distributed three films so far, and all were highly successful at the box office and received good responses from critics.

History
Villagelo Vinayakudu was the first feature film produced under this banner, followed by Kudirithe Kappu Coffee and Paathshala. Paatshala is considered as one of the new age Telugu film and appreciated well by critics. Paathshala successfully marks an innovative edge, in the Telugu film industry, in terms of selection procedure wherein the cast and crew would be finalised through the medium of social networking site, 'Facebook'. The contest hosted on Facebook managed to get more than 15,000 followers within seven days of the launch with 10,000 applicants.

Film production

Awards

References 

Mass media companies established in 2008
Film production companies based in Hyderabad, India
Indian film studios
2008 establishments in Andhra Pradesh